The 1892 West Virginia gubernatorial election took place on November 8, 1892, to elect the governor of West Virginia.

Results

References

1892
gubernatorial
West Virginia
November 1892 events